is a 1966 Japanese chambara film directed by Tokuzō Tanaka and starring Shintaro Katsu as the blind masseur Zatoichi. It was originally released by the Daiei Motion Picture Company (later acquired by Kadokawa Pictures).

Zatoichi's Vengeance is the thirteenth episode in the 26-part film series devoted to the character of Zatoichi.

Plot

Traveling on the road, Zatoichi (Katsu) encounters a dying man who gives him a bag full of money and the name "Taichi". Traveling on, he makes the acquaintance of a blind biwa-playing priest. The two travel to a town that is having their annual thunder drum festival. The town is under the domination of a Yakuza boss who extorts from the people.

Cast
 Shintaro Katsu as Zatoichi
 Shigeru Amachi as Kurobe
 Jun Hamamura as blind priest
 Gen Kimura as Tamekichi
 Koichi Mizuhara as Joshuya
 Mayumi Ogawa as Ocho/Oshino
 Kei Satō as Boss Gonzo

Production
 Yoshinobu Nishioka - Art director

Reception
In a contemporary review, "Chie." of Variety praised the film, noting "superlative camerawork" of Kazuo Miyagawa and compared the Zatoichi series to the James Bond film series, noting its "coolness and sense of fun". "Chie." noted a highlight to be the film's finale with its battle on the bridge as being "splendidly photographed".

From a retrospective review, J. Doyle Wallis, in a review for DVD Talk, wrote that "Zatoichi's Vengeance displays one of the most interesting aspects of Zatoichi as a character."

References

External links

 

Review: Zatoichi's Vengeance (1966)" by Thomas Raven for freakengine (August 2011)
Zatoichi's Vengeance (1966) review by D. Trull for Lard Biscuit Enterprises 
Zatoichi's Vengeance (1966) review by Alec Kubas-Meyer for Unseen Films (15 February 2014)
REVIEW: Zatoichi 13 – Zatoichi’s Vengeance (1966) by Mark Pollard for Kung Fu Cinema

Japanese adventure films
1966 films
Zatoichi films
Daiei Film films
Films set in Japan
Films shot in Japan
Japanese films about revenge
Films scored by Akira Ifukube
Films directed by Tokuzō Tanaka
1960s Japanese films